Sri Satyanarayana Mahathyam is a 1964 Indian Telugu-language Hindu mythological film directed by S. Rajinikanth. It stars N. T. Rama Rao and Krishna Kumari, with music composed by Ghantasala.

Plot 
The film begins with the entrance of Kali Yuga, due to which situations on earth became disastrous. Goddess Bhudevi (Suryakala) prays to Lord Vishnu (N. T. Rama Rao) to take another avatar to which Goddess Lakshmi opposes. So, Lord Vishnu sends a messenger to earth in the form of a baby boy who is adopted by a Saint Sunanda (A. V. Subba Rao) as God's gift and names him as Satyadas. King Sivakeshava (Relangi) an idiotic person feels like God's incarnation who compels the public to worship himself and sends his assistants Nandi (Mukkamala) & Pakshi (Allu Ramalingaiah) to execute the commandment. Once they observe Satyadas praying to Lord Vishnu and captures him. Lord Vishnu sends Sage Narada (Kanta Rao) for his protection and orders him to use as a tool to propagate a religious ritual Satyanarayana Vratam on earth. Firstly, Satyadas makes a Brahmin to perform the ritual, who is weeping for the death of their daughter and she becomes alive. Afterward, a poor woodcutter becomes wealthy and a couple, Sadhu Shetty (Ramana Reddy) and his wife Leelavathi (Chayadevi) were blessed with a baby girl after performing this ritual. Time passes, Satyadas (again N. T. Rama Rao) grows up along with his propaganda and makes an Ashram. Ratnavalli (Krishna Kumari), daughter of Sivakeshava learns regarding Satyadas's propaganda, visits his Ashram and tries to destroy his ritual. But after looking at his ardent devotion she bows her head and starts loving him. Having aware of it, Sivakeshava arrests Satyadas in the fort. Parallelly, Lord Vishnu gives an assurance to Bhudevi to protect the wise and destroy the bad. Here angered Lakshmi on the guidance of Narada gives her extraordinary power of "Sidda Lakshmi" to Sivakesava when people again start worshipping him. But before Satyadas's devotion, it fails. At the same time, Ratnavalli reveals her love interest towards Satyadas to Sivakesava when he becomes furious and orders his henchmen to remove the eyes of Satyadas. Meanwhile, Sage Narada plays a drama who provokes Nandi against the Sivakesava, he captures him along with Ratnavalli when Pakshi rescues them. Immediately, they rush to the forest by the time Satyadas' eyes are removed. Now Nandi sets fire to the forest and he is knockout by Pakshi. During the time of forest fire, Satyadas prays to Lord Vishnu who descends to earth, restores Satyadas's eyesight and shows the Vishwaroopam the entire world form in him. Sridevi & Bhudevi also accompany and performs the marriage of Satyadas & Ratnavalli. Satyadas asks Lord Vishnu to stay on earth to uplift the people, so, Lord Vishnu incarnates in the form of Lord Satyanarayana Swamy and the placed adored by lakhs of people at Annavaram till today.

Cast 
N. T. Rama Rao as Lord Vishnu & Satyadas (dual role)
Krishna Kumari as Ratnavalli
Kanta Rao as Narada Maharshi
Relangi as Sivakesava Maharaju
Ramana Reddy as Sadhu Shetty
Chalam
Mukkamala as Nandi
Allu Ramalingaiah as Pakshi
Prabhakar Reddy as Chandrasena Maharaju
Dr. Sivaramakrishnaiah
Geetanjali as Goddess Lakshmi
Girija as Kalavathi
Chayadevi as Leelavati
Suryakala as Goddess Bhudevi

Soundtrack 

Music composed by Ghantasala. Lyrics were written by Samudrala Jr. Music released by H.M.V. Audio Company.

References 

Hindu mythological films
Films scored by Ghantasala (musician)